Alliance for Progress (APP) is a Peruvian political party founded on December 8, 2001 in Trujillo by Cesar Acuña Peralta.

History 
The party was founded by Cesar Acuña Peralta in Trujillo in 2001 who was elected as Congressman for the National Solidarity Party since 2000. In 2006, the party participated in the general elections of that year with Natale Amprimo as its party candidate for President with the leader Cesar Acuña Peralta as its candidate for First Vice President. The presidential ticket itself attained 0.4% of the popular vote, placing tenth.

Following the 2006 general election's poor results, Alliance for Progress lost its party registration in the National Jury of Elections alongside the rest of the parties that failed to pass the threshold in 2007, but it regained its party registration the following year.

Having already established his party, Acuña, he was elected mayor of Trujillo in 2007 and was re-elected mayor in 2010. In 2014, Acuña was elected regional governor of the department of La Libertad, defeating José Murgia of the APRA but, he resigned from his position as governor in less one year to run for president in the 2016 elections in which he was disqualified for alleged vote buying.

Since 2010, the party was part of the Alliance for the Great Change, made up of the Peruvian Humanist Party, the Christian People’s Party, the National Restoration and the Alliance for Progress, this alliance was led by Pedro Pablo Kuczynski, who unsuccessfully ran for president in the general elections of Peru in 2011. In these elections, APP obtained 2 of the 130 seats in the Congress of the Republic.

In June 2012, the National Office of Electoral Processes (ONPE) fined the party more than 9 million soles for having received contributions ten times greater than the allowed limit from the César Vallejo University, owned by César Acuña.

In 2016, the party presented Acuña as their presidential candidate, however on 9 March the National Elections Jury barred him from participating in the general election for violating the Political Parties Law. The party currently holds 22 seats in the Congress after the 2020 snap parliamentary elections, a gain compared to the 9 seats the party won at the 2016 general elections.

For the 2021 general elections, the Alliance for Progress formed an alliance with the Christian People’s Party. The alliance was officially signed on 12 October 2020, but lasted only six days, upon the revelation of disconformity from PPC's leadership, most prominently from the party Secretary General, Marisol Pérez Tello, who rejected Acuña by stating "she would not support a plagiarizer". Illegal audios were revealed by the press, and the alliance broke off almost immediately. Subsequently, the Alliance for Progress nominated Cesar Acuña once again for the presidency and, he ultimately placed seventh with 6% of the popular vote in a heavily atomized election, managing to win La Libertad Region only, the party’s stronghold, although the party achieved congressional representation, winning 15 seats, a loss of 7 from the previous congressional term.

Political position 
The party has been described as supporting right-wing and far-right politics. Following Pedro Castillo's success in the first round of 2021 elections, party leader Cesar Acuña began a campaign tour promoting Fujimorism and Keiko Fujimori titled "Crusade for Peru", creating an alliance with her and stating to supporters at a rally "I forget acts of corruption of Fujimorism" while also condemning left-wing politics.

Electoral history

Presidential

Congress of the Republic

See also
APRA
Popular Force
Popular Action
Politics of Peru

References

2001 establishments in Peru
Conservative liberal parties
Conservative parties in Peru
Liberal parties in Peru
Political parties established in 2001
Political parties in Peru